George Boardman (born 20 October 1904) was a Scottish professional footballer who played for Partick Thistle, Bradford (Park Avenue) and Nairn County, mainly as an inside forward although he also featured at centre half and centre forward.

He played for Partick in the 1930 Scottish Cup Final which they lost to Rangers after a replay, but did manage to claim winner's medals with the Jags in the Glasgow Merchants Charity Cup in 1927 and the one-off Glasgow Dental Hospital Cup in 1928, both against the same opponents.

Personal life
His son George and grandson Craig were also footballers.

References

1904 births
1969 deaths
Scottish footballers
People from Dennistoun
Footballers from Glasgow
Parkhead F.C. players
Ashfield F.C. players
Bradford (Park Avenue) A.F.C. players
Partick Thistle F.C. players
Nairn County F.C. players
Scottish Football League players
Scottish Junior Football Association players
Highland Football League players
Association football inside forwards